Diego Jesús de la Cruz Manilla (born 11 April 1989) is a Mexican professional footballer who plays for Tapachula of Ascenso MX on loan Cruz Azul. Also play for the Regals SCA. 2017

External links

1989 births
Living people
Association football midfielders
Cruz Azul Hidalgo footballers
Irapuato F.C. footballers
Cafetaleros de Chiapas footballers
Ascenso MX players
Liga Premier de México players
Tercera División de México players
Juventus Managua players
Footballers from Mexico City
Mexican footballers